Child Bride: The Untold Story of Priscilla Beaulieu Presley is a book written by Suzanne Finstad in 1997. It is an account of Priscilla Presley's life which differs from her own account in her book, Elvis and Me.

Background 
Published by Harmony Books, (1st First Edition), it painted Priscilla Presley in a rather negative light and described her as a "wild child" and "sexpot". The sources of this book are several people who knew Elvis Presley and Priscilla well, among them many friends from Priscilla's childhood and adolescence, Elvis's stepbrother Rick Stanley, Mike Edwards, Elvis's ex-girlfriends and the wives of the Memphis Mafia men. The author writes that Priscilla promised sexual favors in exchange for meeting Elvis with Currie Grant, a married, 27-year-old man who knew the singer, that she wasn't a virgin on her wedding night, as she and Elvis slept together on their second date.

The book also says that Priscilla didn't want to come to live with Elvis, but that her marriage was part of a mastermind for fame hatched by Priscilla and her mother and that she never loved Elvis. Her parents had forced Elvis to marry Priscilla against her will. It also describes the often dark side of their sensational marriage. Further, the author reveals the singer's kinky tastes and his constant demands on Priscilla's appearance.

Reaction 
Finstad takes many quotes that Priscilla has made and calls them a web of lies that she has spun in publications such as Elvis and Me.

Priscilla Presley filed a lawsuit against Currie Grant for his claims in the book, stating in her action that his claims were fabrications. On August 19, 1998 Los Angeles Superior Court Judge Daniel Curry found defendant Currie Grant guilty of defamation and ordered him to pay $75,000. (Priscilla had sued for at least $10 million.) "I am very pleased that I have been vindicated by this judgment," she said in a statement. The Contra Costa Times of August 26, 1998 commented, "She didn't say if she was pleased with her winnings."

However, Suzanne Finstad and the publisher of the book weren't sued. Finstad and her publisher also say they stand by the account in the book.

References 

1997 non-fiction books
Books about actors
Priscilla Presley